Katharina Hennig (born 14 June 1996) is a German cross-country skier who represents the club WSC Ergebirge Oberwiesenthal. She resides in Königswalde. Her novel achievements to date are the winning gold medal in the team sprint and the silver medal in the 4 × 5 km relay at the 2022 Winter Olympics in Beijing, China and silver medal in the 4 × 5 km relay at the 2023 World Champions in Planica, Slovenia.    

She belonged to SV Neudorf until 2011 and then started to compete for WSC Erzgebirge Oberwiesenthal in 2011. At the Junior World Championships she won bronze medals with the German women's relay team in 2013 and 2015. Her best result at the Junior World Championships was the silver medal in the 10 km freestyle race behind Sweden Ebba Andersson in Rasnov, Romania. She made her World Cup debut on January 24, 2016 in Nové Město, Czech Republic. In January 2017, she achieved her first World Cup podium finish in Ulricehamn, finishing second in the team relay.

She competed at the FIS Nordic World Ski Championships 2017 in Lahti, Finland. In Lahti, her best finishes were 11th in skiathlon and sixth in team relay.

Cross-country skiing results
All results are sourced from the International Ski Federation (FIS).

Olympic Games
2 medals – (1 gold, 1 silver)

World Championships
1 medal – (1 silver)

World Cup

Season standings

Individual podiums
 1 victory – (1 ) 
 7 podiums – (4 , 3 )

Team podiums
 2 podiums – (2 )

References

External links

1996 births
Living people
German female cross-country skiers
Tour de Ski skiers
Cross-country skiers at the 2018 Winter Olympics
Cross-country skiers at the 2022 Winter Olympics
Olympic cross-country skiers of Germany
Medalists at the 2022 Winter Olympics
Olympic gold medalists for Germany
Olympic silver medalists for Germany
Olympic medalists in cross-country skiing
People from Annaberg-Buchholz
Sportspeople from Saxony